Hosne Ara (known by the stage name Nargis Akhter) is a Bangladeshi actress. She won the Bangladesh National Film Award for Best Supporting Actress for her performance in the film Maya: The Lost Mother (2019).

Background
Akhter is a sister of actress Anwara Begum. She has another sister, Shamsunnahar, and a brother, Humayun Kabir (d. 2020). Hosne acted in her first theatre play Kuashar Kanna.  In 1973, she changed her name to Nargis as she started acting in Khan Ataur Rahman produced film Jhorer Pakhi.

Career
Akhter acted in several films including Abodan, Gunahgar, Champa Chameli, Bhai Aamar Bhai, Adalot, Nolok, Fakir Majnu Shah, Rong Berong, Sareng Bou, Mayar Badhon and Ramer Sumoti. She also performed in television series like Ayna, Hiramon and Bou Kotha Kou.

References

External  links
 

Living people
Bangladeshi film actresses
Best Supporting Actress National Film Award (Bangladesh) winners
Bangladeshi television actresses
Place of birth missing (living people)
Year of birth missing (living people)